Max Media is a company that owns radio stations throughout the United States. It is based in Virginia Beach, Virginia.

History
Max Media was founded in 2001. Prior to this, some of the company's management had run the TVX Broadcast Group from 1979 until its sale in 1991 to Paramount Communications (which renamed Mata mare 
it the Paramount Stations Group), and had also run Max Media Properties (similarly named to the current company) from then until its sale in 1998 to the Sinclair Broadcast Group (which owned some former TVX stations).

On September 30, 2013, the Cowles Publishing Company acquired Max Media's Montana television station cluster for $18 million. 

On October 31, 2013, Sinclair acquired the non-license assets of WPFO(TV), Waterville, Maine, for $13.6 million; the deal made it a sister station to WGME-TV, Portland, Maine, which already produced a newscast for the station. On November 20, 2013, it was announced that Cunningham Broadcasting was to acquire the license assets for $3.4 million. The sale of the license assets was approved on June 23, 2017.

On January 9, 2014, Max Media sold its six Arkansas-based radio stations to Bobby Caldwell's East Arkansas Broadcasters for $3 million.

Effective November 5, 2015, Max Media sold its four Pennsylvania-based radio stations to Kristin Cantrell's Southern Belle, LLC for $3.8 million.

On April 5, 2017, Max Media announced that it was selling NBC affiliate WNKY(TV) in Bowling Green, Kentucky to Marquee Broadcasting for $5.6 million. The sale was completed on June 30, 2017.

All television stations either directly or indirectly owned by Max Media were sold off by 2019, leaving the company with a portfolio consisting solely of radio stations.

Current stations

Radio

Former stations

Television

Radio

Notes

References

External links

Mass media companies established in 2001
Radio broadcasting companies of the United States
Companies based in Virginia Beach, Virginia
Max Media radio stations